Karl Marx (1818–1883) was a German philosopher and economist.

Karl Marx or Karl Marks may also refer to:

People
Karl Friedrich Heinrich Marx (1796–1877), German physician and lecturer
Karl Marx (medical missionary) (1857–1891), German doctor
Karl Marx (composer) (1897–1985), German composer
Karl Marx (painter), lecturer at Kölner Werkschulen

Ships
Karl Marks (ship), a river cruise ship
Karl Marks (ship, 1957), a Rodina-class motorship
Karl Marks (ship, 1958), a river cruise ship

Other uses
 Karl Marx Peak, a mountain peak in Tajikistan
 Karl Marks, Jalal-Abad, a village in Kyrgyzstan
 Chemnitz, a German city named Karl-Marx-Stadt from 1953 to 1990
 Karl-Marx-Allee, a monumental boulevard in Berlin
 Karl-Marx-Hof, a large residential building in Vienna, Austria
 Karl Marx Theatre (Teatro Karl Marx), a large entertainment complex in Havana, Cuba
 Karl Marx House or Karl-Marx-Haus, the house in Trier in which Karl Marx was born
 University of Leipzig, named Karl Marx University from 1953 to 1991

See also
Marx (disambiguation)

Marx, Karl